"Cock-A-Doodle-Doo! or, The Crowing of the Nobel Cock Beneventano" is an 1853 short story by the American writer Herman Melville. It was first published in the December 1853 issue of Harper's Magazine, the same month the second installment of "Bartleby, the Scrivener" appeared in Putnam's. The story remained uncollected until 1922, when Princeton University Press included it in The Apple-Tree Table and Other Sketches.

Most scholars agree that this story satirizes Transcendentalist philosophy, in particular Henry David Thoreau's A Week on the Concord and Merrimack Rivers.

References

External links

 

Herman Melville
1853 short stories
Short stories by Herman Melville
Works originally published in Harper's Magazine